Kingsland is a city in Camden County, Georgia, United States. The population was 18,337 at the 2020 census.

The Kingsland Commercial Historic District was added to the National Register of Historic Places on March 17, 1994. It includes the area surrounding South Lee Street between King Street and William Street. It hosts an annual Catfish Festival on Labor Day weekend, and is the location where the fan series Star Trek Continues was filmed.

History
Kingsland was platted in the 1894 when the railroad was extended to that point, and named after William Henry King, the original owner of the site.

Geography
Kingsland is in southwestern Camden County at  (30.794612, -81.671720), just north of the Florida line. It is bordered by St. Marys to the east. Interstate 95 runs through the eastern part of the city, with access from three exits. U.S. Route 17, an older highway running parallel to I-95, passes through the center of Kingsland.

This recent growth makes Kingsland Georgia's 12th-largest city by land mass.

Climate
Kingsland experiences a humid subtropical climate with hot, humid summers and mild winters.

Demographics

2020 census

As of the 2020 United States census, there were 18,337 people, 6,118 households, and 4,546 families residing in the city.

2000 census
As of the census of 2000, there were 10,506 people, 3,620 households, and 2,722 families residing in the city. The racial makeup of the city was 73.25% White, 21.14% African American, 0.58% Native American, 1.54% Asian, 0.06% Pacific Islander, 1.24% from other races, and 2.19% from two or more races. Hispanic or Latino of any race were 3.61% of the population.

There were 3,620 households, of which 50.1% had children under the age of 18 living with them, 60.4% were married couples living together, 11.0% had a female householder with no husband present, and 24.8% were non-families. 19.0% of all households were made up of individuals, and 3.3% had someone living alone who was 65 years of age or older. The average household size was 2.90 and the average family size was 3.34.

In the city, the population was spread out, with 34.8% under the age of 18, 10.1% from 18 to 24, 38.5% from 25 to 44, 13.0% from 45 to 64, and 3.6% who were 65 years of age or older. The median age was 28. For every 100 females, there were 100.7 males. For every 100 females age 18 and over, there were 98.4 males.

The median income for a household in the city was $41,303, and the median income for a family was $44,708. Males had a median income of $32,795 versus $20,856 for females. The per capita income for the city was $14,997. About 8.1% of families and 9.6% of the population were below the poverty line, including 9.0% of those under age 18 and 28.8% of those age 65 or over.

Education

Higher education 
College of Coastal Georgia

Secondary 
Camden County High School

Primary 
Camden County Middle School
Kingsland Elementary School
Matilda Harris Elementary School
David L. Rainer Elementary School
Mamie Lou Gross Elementary School
Crooked River Elementary School

Private schools 
Coastal Academy
New Hope Christian Academy

See also
 Interstate 95 in Georgia
 College of Coastal Georgia
 Georgia State Route 40
 Kingsland Commercial Historic District
 Atlantic, Waycross and Northern Railroad
 List of municipalities in Georgia (U.S. state)
 National Register of Historic Places listings in Georgia
 WKBX

References

Further reading

External links

 
 Kingsland Convention & Visitors Bureau
 

1894 establishments in Georgia (U.S. state)
Cities in Camden County, Georgia
Cities in Georgia (U.S. state)
Planned cities in the United States
Populated places established in 1894